Gymnocalycium fischeri is a globular cactus of the family Cactaceae. The first description was in 2002 by Josef Halda Jacob, Petr Kupčák, Emil Lukasik and Jaromír Sladkovský. The specific epithet honors the Czech cactus collector Ladislav Fischer.

Description
The single central spine is rare or absent and it is formed only in older plants. The five to seven (rarely nine) radiating, rigid spines are gray-brown. The funnel-shaped, white to pale pink blooms have a darker pink throat.

Distribution

Subspecies
 Gymnocalycium fischeri subsp. suyuquense E.Berger, 2003

References
 Biolib
 Tropicos
J. J. Halda et al.: New descriptions and combinations. In: Acta Musei Richnoviensis Sect. Nat.

Bibliography
Urs Eggli, Leonard E. Newton: Etymological Dictionary of Succulent Plant Names. Birkhäuser 2004

fischeri
Cacti of South America
Endemic flora of Argentina